Arne Kleven (8 January 1900 – 19 February 1991) was a Danish footballer. He played in two matches for the Denmark national football team from 1927 to 1931.

References

External links
 

1900 births
1991 deaths
Danish men's footballers
Denmark international footballers
Place of birth missing
Association footballers not categorized by position